James D. Sachs (born 1949) is a retired United States Air Force veteran, video game artist and game programmer.

Sachs was the lead artist on the groundbreaking Amiga computer game Defender of the Crown from Cinemaware (first published in 1986). He is also the author of the Commodore 64 game Saucer Attack, which was heavily pirated. He called it "the Commodore 64 game everyone had, but no one purchased". He is also the author of the CompuTrainer 3D software, Marine Aquarium simulation screensaver SereneScreen Aquarium, and of the user interfaces and start-up animations of the Amiga CDTV and Amiga CD32.

Some time after finishing development of Defender of the Crown, Sachs began working on a video game adaptation of the 20,000 Leagues Under the Sea. Unable to secure from Disney the rights for a game based on their 1954 film, Sachs instead based his design on the original book by Jules Verne, but was ultimately unable to secure funding.

External links
 James D. Sachs home page
 James D. Sachs Interview - 2020 on AmigaLove.com
 James D. Sachs page on MobyGames
 Interview with James D. Sachs
 The same interview in French on Obligement
 The Art of James D. Sachs on Yo Ho Video
 Jim Sachs Interview - June 2009 at the Personal Computer Museum

American computer programmers
Living people
1949 births
Video game artists
Video game programmers